Joseph Miller (died October 1784) was a noted English cricketer who is generally considered to have been one of the greatest batsmen of the 18th century. He is mostly associated with Kent but also made appearances for All-England and Surrey. First recorded in the 1769 season, Miller made 65 known appearances (including single wicket) from then to 1783. He was unquestionably an outstanding batsman and perhaps second only to John Small in the 18th century.

Cricket career
Miller may have played before 1772, but more is known about his career from 1772 when scorecards began to be kept on a habitual basis. The first definite mention of him is in a "fives" single wicket match between Kent and Hampshire at the Artillery Ground in June 1772. He took part in all three important matches recorded in the 1772 season. In the second, playing for All-England against Hampshire at Guildford Bason, he was top scorer for his team in both innings with 30 out of 126 and then 26 out of only 86.

In 1773, he scored a total of 316 runs in his seven known important match appearances with a best score of 73 (out of 177) for All-England against Hampshire at Sevenoaks Vine. When Kent played Surrey at Sevenoaks Vine in August 1773, Miller scored 42 out of 141 in the first innings and then an unbeaten 32 out of 100/4 in the second innings. In September 1773, Miller played as a given man for Surrey v Hampshire at Laleham Burway.

Miller's best known performance was for Kent v Hampshire at Sevenoaks Vine in August 1774 when he made 95 out of 240 and enabled Kent to win by an innings and 35 runs. A week later, in the return match at Broadhalfpenny Down, Miller scored 40 and 45 out of 168 and 136/6 as Kent won by 4 wickets.

Miller's innings of 95 was briefly the highest individual score recorded in first-class cricket, beating the 88 scored by William Yalden in 1773. Miller's "world record" lasted only a year until John Small beat it with the earliest known first-class century.

Miller was less successful in 1775 and experienced a number of low scores but he did play two notable innings of 71 for Kent v Hampshire and then 42 for Surrey against Hampshire. He had an indifferent season in 1776 but then recovered his form in 1777 when he made a total of 311 runs in six known appearances including scores of 65, 64 and 51 in three separate matches for All-England against Hampshire. He made a few useful scores in 1778 when his best was 59 for Surrey against Hampshire.

Miller made only one more half-century which was a score of exactly 50 for All-England against Hampshire at Itchin Stoke Down in September 1780. His date of birth is unknown but, as he had been playing since the 1760s, he must have reached the veteran stage by the 1780s and his scores were less notable than they had been a decade earlier. Apart from a few useful contributions, Miller was by 1782 playing a minor role. He made three known appearances in 1783, his final season, and his last known match was Kent v Hampshire at Bourne Paddock in August. Hampshire won by 85 runs and, if the batting order in the scorecard is correct, Miller batted last and scored just 2 and 9.

Style and personality
Arthur Haygarth's biography of Miller quotes John Nyren's comment that Miller had a beautiful style and was as "firm and steady as the Pyramids". He was a man "to be depended on and very active" as well as being "a kind-hearted and amiable man".

Nyren also says that Miller and John Minshull were "the only two batsmen (i.e., in the 1770s) that the Hambledon men were afraid of". He comments on Miller's ability to "cut a ball at the point of the bat" and adds, slightly contradicting Haygarth's version, that "although (Miller was) fully as stout a man as Minshull, he was considerably more active".

Little is known about Miller personally except that he seems to have been a gamekeeper employed by the Duke of Dorset at Knole House near Sevenoaks. Latterly, he took up residence with Sir Horatio Mann at Bourne, probably in the same employment. His burial took place at Bridge, Kent on 31 October 1784, only a year after his last recorded match.

Alternative first name
Miller's first name may be subject to question for, although he is generally known as Joseph, he has also been referred to as Richard, though that would seem to be due to confusion with the Richard Miller who played alongside him in one match for Surrey in the 1774 season. In his Cricket Scores, H. T. Waghorn records that "Richard Miller" played for Kent against Surrey at Laleham Burway in June 1773 but in Haygarth's version of this scorecard, he has listed the player as "J. Miller".

The majority of sources call him J. or Joseph although Nyren, a great admirer of Miller, uses his surname only.

Haygarth, who studied all of the old scorecards and biographical material available, acknowledges that "there seems to have been two (Millers) but it is almost certain that J was the "crack" and played in the great contests of the day". G. B. Buckley does not attempt to correct Haygarth re Miller in his appendix of additions and amendments to Scores and Biographies and thereby accepts that J. Miller is the correct version.

Notes

References

Bibliography
 
 
 
 
 
 
 
 
 

1784 deaths
English cricketers
English cricketers of 1701 to 1786
Year of birth unknown
Surrey cricketers
Kent cricketers
East Kent cricketers
Non-international England cricketers
People from Bridge, Kent